Steven Jude Hoffenberg (January 12, 1945 – August 2022) was an American businessman and fraudster. He was the founder, CEO, president, and chairman of Towers Financial Corporation, a debt collection agency, which was later discovered to be a Ponzi scheme. In 1993, he rescued the New York Post from bankruptcy, and briefly owned the paper. Towers Financial collapsed in 1993, and in 1995 Hoffenberg pleaded guilty to bilking investors out of $475 million. He was sentenced to 20 years in prison (serving 18 years), plus a $1 million fine and $463 million in restitution. The U.S. SEC considered his financial crimes to be "one of the largest Ponzi schemes in history".

Early life and career
Hoffenberg was born in Brooklyn, New York to a Jewish family on January 12, 1945, along with a twin brother, Martin.

Hoffenberg owned the New York Post from January to March 1993. The Towers Ponzi scheme quickly imploded, ending his tenure, which had seen mass layoffs, a mass walkout on the part of the paper's staff, and missed publications.  

In 1971 Hoffensberg pleaded guilty to attempted second-degree larceny for trying a steal a diamond in New York. Despite initially denying reports he had indicating his involvement but at his trial, he admitted he was once "involved in a theft".

Towers financial corporation 
In the early 1970s, Hoffenberg founded Towers Financial Corporation, a New York City debt collection agency that was supposed to buy debts that people owed to hospitals, banks, and phone companies. He was its Chief Executive Officer, President, and Chairman.  It was later discovered to be a Ponzi scheme.In February the Securities and Exchange Commission began a civil action against him and others, and in March 1993 Towers Financial filed for bankruptcy. In April 1995 Hoffenberg pleaded guilty to bilking investors out of $475 million. The SEC considered his financial crimes as "one of the largest Ponzi schemes in history" at the time.

Prison sentence 
In 1997, Judge Robert W. Sweet sentenced Hoffenberg to 20 years in prison. He spent 18 years at several prisons, including FCI Fort Dix (Fort Dix, New Jersey) and the Federal Medical Center, Devens (in Devens, Massachusetts), plus a $1 million fine and $463 million in restitution. Per the U.S. Bureau of Prisons, he was released in October 2013. He settled a civil suit with the U.S. Securities and Exchange Commission for $60 million.

Relationship with Jeffrey Epstein
In 1987, he met Jeffrey Epstein through a British defense contractor named Douglas Leese (died 2011), who Hoffenberg claimed was an arms dealer. Leese was, with Saudi Adnan Khashoggi and Prince Bandar bin Sultan Al Saud, architect in the billion dollar Al-Yamamah arms deal, Britain's biggest arms deal ever concluded – earning the prime contractor, BAE Systems, at least GBP 43 billion in revenue between 1985 and 2007. Leese told Hoffenberg about Epstein: "The guy's a genius, he's great at selling securities. And he has no moral compass." Hoffenberg hired Epstein about 1987 and 1993 to help with the Towers Financial Corporation, paid him $25,000 a month and gave him a $2 million loan in 1988 that Epstein would never have to pay back. 

Hoffenberg set Epstein up in offices in the Villard Houses. They unsuccessfully tried to take over Pan Am in a corporate raid with Towers Financial as their raiding vessel. Their bid failed, in part because of the 1988 terrorist bombing of Pan Am Flight 103 over Lockerbie, which ultimately contributed to the airline's bankruptcy. A similar unsuccessful bid in 1988 was made to take over Emery Air Freight Corp.

During this period, Hoffenberg and Epstein worked closely together and traveled everywhere on Hoffenberg's private jet. Hoffenberg began using Towers Financial funds to pay off earlier investors and pay for a lavish lifestyle that included a Locust Valley, New York, Long Island mansion, as well as homes on Sutton Place (in Manhattan) and in Florida, and a number of cars and planes.

In court documents, Hoffenberg claimed that Epstein was intimately involved in the Ponzi scheme. Epstein left Towers Financial before it collapsed and was never charged for being involved with the massive investor fraud committed.

In 2016, Hoffenberg and some of his victims sued Epstein, seeking restitution. He asserted in court that Epstein had been intimately involved in Tower's financial practices and called Epstein the "architect of the scam". In July 2019, following Epstein's arrest on charges of sex trafficking of minors and conspiracy to commit sex trafficking, Hoffenberg again claimed that Epstein was his "uncharged co-conspirator" in the Ponzi scheme. Former Towers investors made similar allegations in a lawsuit filed in August 2018. The lawsuit also alleged that the millions in stolen investments were the seed capital for Epstein's hedge fund, which it valued at $50 billion.

Personal life and death
On July 10, 2014, he married Post All Star News president, Maria Santiago, after a one month romance. The ceremony was held in front of Trump Tower in Manhattan. He was married twice before, and had a daughter.

Hoffenberg was found dead at his apartment in Derby, Connecticut, on August 23, 2022, at the age of 77. Epstein accuser Maria Farmer said she called police to check in on Hoffenberg after she failed to reach him over the phone during the preceding week. His body was in an advanced state of decomposition, and a Derby police officer estimated that he had been dead for roughly a week by the time his remains were found. An initial autopsy found no evidence of trauma on his body and police said they believe he died of natural causes. He had tested positive for COVID-19 not long before his death.

References

1945 births
2022 deaths
20th-century American businesspeople
20th-century American criminals
American businesspeople convicted of crimes
American chief executives of financial services companies
American confidence tricksters
American Jews
American prisoners and detainees
American twins
Businesspeople from Brooklyn
Criminals from New York City
New York Post people
Prisoners and detainees of the United States federal government
Pyramid and Ponzi schemes